Petra Häkkinen (born 01 January 1979) is a retired Finnish footballer. Lindstrom spent most of her career at HJK.

Career

The highlight of Petra Häkkinen's career was winning the Finnish League in 2005 with HJK.

Since retiring Petra Häkkinen was hired as the head goalkeeping for the Finland women's national football team.

International career

Petra Häkkinen was part of the Finnish team at the 2009 European Championships.

References

1979 births
Living people
Kansallinen Liiga players
People from Helsinki
Helsingin Jalkapalloklubi (women) players
Finnish women's footballers
Finland women's international footballers
Women's association football goalkeepers